Keep It Together may refer to:

 Keep It Together (album), an album by Guster, or the title song
 "Keep It Together" (Madonna song)
 "Keep It Together", a song by Puddle of Mudd from the album Volume 4: Songs in the Key of Love & Hate